The 1974 Vermont Catamounts football team represented the Vermont Catamounts football team of the University of Vermont during the 1974 NCAA Division II football season.  This was Vermont's last season with an NCAA program.

Schedule

References

Vermont
Vermont Catamounts football seasons
Vermont Catamounts football